The humid temperate climate is a temperate climate sub-type mainly located at mid latitudes. It is characterized by humidity and rain throughout the year from oceanic influence. Although the term humid temperate climate is not used in the Köppen climate classification, this climate type may fall under the Cf classification, which indicates a temperate climate without a dry season.  This climate is sometimes referred to as the oceanic climate, which is actually a sub-type of the humid temperate climate.

Sub-types 
The humid temperate climate has several subtypes, classified by temperature.

Humid subtropical climate (Cfa)

The humid subtropical climate, like other subtropical climates, is characterized by a hot summer. It is also called the chinese climate or pampeano climate because it is found in the southeast of China and Argentina. The typical vegetation in this climate is subtropical forest.

Oceanic climate (Cfb)

The oceanic climate, also known as a marine climate, is characterized by warm summers and moderate winters. It is found on continental western coasts. The typical vegetation in oceanic climates is humid temperate forest.

Subtropical highland climate (Cfb, Cwb, Cwc) 

The subtropical highland climate is the low-latitude variation of the oceanic climate. This relatively consistent temperature and rainfall is caused by the location of this climate at up to 2500 m altitude. It is mainly found in the highlands of Andes, Central America and New Guinea.

Subpolar oceanic climate (Cfc)

The subpolar oceanic climate is located in high latitudes, at the border between the oceanic climate and polar climate. This climate has cold summers and the vegetation of subpolar forests.

See also
 Temperate climate
 Humid subtropical climate
 Oceanic climate
 Köppen climate classification
 Temperate zone

References

Climate and weather classification systems